Monoclona is a genus of fungus gnats in the family Mycetophilidae. There are about 18 described species in Monoclona.

Species
These 18 species belong to the genus Monoclona:

 Monoclona abnormalis Fisher, 1939 c g
 Monoclona atrata Strobl, 1898 c g
 Monoclona bicolor Enderlein, 1910 c g
 Monoclona conspicua Zaitzev, 1983 i c g
 Monoclona digitata Edwards, 1940 c g
 Monoclona floridensis Fisher, 1946 i c g
 Monoclona forcipata Strobl, 1909 c g
 Monoclona furcata Johannsen, 1910 i c g
 Monoclona laosilvatica Sevcik, 2001 c g
 Monoclona maculata Edwards, 1933 c g
 Monoclona mikii Kertész, 1898 c g
 Monoclona nigriventris Edwards, 1940 c g
 Monoclona orientalis Zaitzev, 1983 c g
 Monoclona rufilatera (Walker, 1837) i c g b
 Monoclona silvatica Zaitzev, 1983 c g
 Monoclona simplex Garrett, 1925 i c g
 Monoclona tapicarei Lane, 1952 c g
 Monoclona trifasciata Edwards, 1940 c g

Data sources: i = ITIS, c = Catalogue of Life, g = GBIF, b = Bugguide.net

References

Further reading

 

Mycetophilidae
Articles created by Qbugbot
Sciaroidea genera